The Blackheath Poisonings is a British period crime television series which originally aired on ITV in 3 episodes between 7 and 9 December 1992. It is an adaptation of the 1978 novel of the same title by Julian Symons.

Cast

 Christine Kavanagh as Isabel Collard 
 Ian McNeice as George Collard
 Zoë Wanamaker as Charlotte Collard
 Judy Parfitt as Harriet Collard
 Patrick Malahide as Robert Dangerfield
 James Faulkner as Roger Vandervent
 Christien Anholt as Paul Vandervent
 Julia St John as  Beatrice Vandervent
 Nicholas Woodeson as Bertie Williams
 Ronald Fraser as Doctor Porter
 George Anton as Doctor Hassall
 Danny Schiller as Morley
 Andrew Robertson as Landlord
 Donald Sumpter as Inspector Titmarsh 
 Ian Bartholomew as Jenkins
 Dafydd Hywel as  Sergeant Davis
 Gabrielle Cowburn as  Hilda 
 Ralph Nossek as Family Solicitor
 Basil Hoskins as Napier
 Rosalind Knight as Lady Reading Poetry
 Bob Goody as  Thompkins
 Douglas McFerran as Bookie's Clerk
 Lucy Briers as 	 Maid
 Kenneth Haigh as  Sir Charles Russell
 Colin Jeavons as Makepeace
 James Coyle as Chaplain
 Richard Strange as Oscar Wilde
 Robert Flemyng as Judge
 Robert Longden as Flossie
 Neville Phillips as  Clerk of Court

References

Bibliography
Baskin, Ellen . Serials on British Television, 1950-1994. Scolar Press, 1996.
 Forshaw, Barry. British Crime Film: Subverting the Social Order. Springer, 2012.
 Tanitch, Robert. Oscar Wilde on Stage and Screen. Methuen, 1999.

External links
 

ITV television dramas
1992 British television series debuts
1992 British television series endings
1990s British drama television series
1990s British television miniseries
1990s British mystery television series
English-language television shows
Television series by ITV Studios
Television shows produced by Central Independent Television
Television shows based on British novels
Television shows set in London
Television series set in the 1890s